Wabasca is an oil field in a remote area of northern Alberta, Canada. It is the fourth largest deposit of oil sands located in Alberta, located southwest of the larger Athabasca oil sands deposit.  It is also known as the Pelican Lake Oilfield.

The closest community is Wabasca. Most oil is produced from the Wabiskaw Sandstone, formation equivalent to the one excavated in the Athabasca Oil Sands, but from sub-surface. While services are located in the nearby hamlet of Wabasca, the oil field is also served by the Pelican Airport. Most interests in this area are owned by Canadian Natural Resources, who purchased Cenovus Energy's operations in the area in 2017.

See also
 Athabasca oil sands
 Cold Lake oil sands
 Melville Island oil sands
 Peace River oil sands
 List of articles about Canadian tar sands
 Petroleum production in Canada

References

External links
Google Maps satellite view

Oil fields of Alberta
Municipal District of Opportunity No. 17
Bituminous sands of Canada